John Storyk (born May 10, 1946) is a registered architect and acoustician who, together with wife and business partner Beth Walters, co-founded Walters-Storyk Design Group (WSDG). Beginning in 1968 with Electric Lady Studios for Jimi Hendrix in New York City, and founding partner (with wife and business partner Beth Walters) of Walters-Storyk Design Group. Soon to celebrate his 50th anniversary as an innovative recording studio designer, he began his career in 1968  with  Electric Lady Studios for Jimi Hendrix in New York City, Storyk and WSDG have produced the provided design, system integration, and construction supervision services for nearly 4000 professional audio recording and video production/post-production studios, performance venues, sports venues, houses of worship and educational facilities. His work includes private studios for Jay-Z, Bruce Springsteen, Alicia Keys, Whitney Houston, Bob Marley, Aerosmith, Green Day, Goo Goo Dolls and R. Kelly.

Career

As an aspiring musician and architecture student at Princeton and Columbia Universities, Storyk’s career has followed a natural pursuit of his two favorite subjects. After graduating from Princeton University in 1968, Storyk's first commission was for Jimi Hendrix's Electric Lady Studios in New York City's Greenwich Village, a studio that continues to be utilized by notable acts ranging from Adele to Daft Punk and Ed Sheeran.

John Storyk is a member of the American Institute of Architects (AIA) and the Audio Engineering Society (AES). He is a frequent contributor to AES Convention Panels and Papers. A recipient of the AES Fellowship Award, he lectures at schools around the U.S. and has established courses in acoustics at Yale University, Columbia, NYU, Ex’Pression College, San Francisco; Full Sail Center, Orlando; and Berklee College of Music. Committed to the support of pro audio education, Storyk also serves as an adjunct professor at the Berklee College of Music in Boston.

Walters-Storyk Design Group
In 1987, Storyk and his wife Beth Walters co-founded Walters-Storyk Design Group (WSDG). WSDG has produced the design and construction of over 3500 world-class audio and video production facilities, recording studios, radio stations, corporate media and conference rooms, educational, sports and entertainment facilities, clubs, restaurants  and theaters. WSDG maintains a staff of fifty designers and engineers, and offices in New York City, Washington, D.C., San Francisco, Los Angeles, Miami, Buenos Aires, Belo Horizonte, Basel, Berlin, Beijing, Barcelona, Mexico City, Mumbai, and St. Petersburg.

WSDG recording studio credits include Alicia Keys' and Ann Mincieli's Jungle City Studios a $6+ million New York City ‘Destination Studio’ completed in 2011, which was featured in the New York Times and Vanity Fair, and recognized with a TEC Award. In 2013, multi-Grammy & Academy Award-winning producer Paul Epworth utilized WSDG for the renovation of The Church Studios in London. WSDG-designed 55TEC Studios in Beijing opened in May 2017, producing nearly a dozen China Top-ten hits in its first ten months, including six #1’s. Storyk and WSDG's credits range from large recording facilities in Kuala Lumpur to New York City’s Jazz at Lincoln Center performance complex, Le Poisson Rouge and Feinstein's/54 Below, to studios in Argentina, Brazil, Europe and China. 

WSDG broadcast facility design credits include architecture and/or audio-acoustic planning and design for CBS, WNET, and Food Network in New York City, TSR Broadcasting in Geneva, UPC Broadcasting in Amsterdam, VGTRK All-Russia State Television and Radio Broadcasting Company in Moscow, and, in partnership with ARTEC Consultants, the audio studios at Jazz at Lincoln Center, now operating as XM Broadcasting facilities. Storyk also designed MJH Studios in Cranbury, New Jersey.

WSDG educational facility design credits include distance-learning facilities for Hunter College in New York City (2016), the Ross School in East Hampton, New York, the $6.8 million NYU Steinhardt James L. Dolan Recording/Teaching/Research Complex in New York City (2009), the Berklee Music Education/Production Complex at 160 Massachusetts Avenue in Boston (2014), Berklee Valencia in Valencia, Spain (2012), Drexel University in Philadelphia, Pennsylvania (2017), Rensselaer Polytechnic Institute in Troy, New York (2018), ICESI University in Cali, Colombia (2020), and Concordia University Irvine in Irvine, California (2020).

Notable projects

 Electric Lady Studios - New York City, USA
 Jazz at Lincoln Center - New York City, USA
 Synchrosound Studios - Kuala Lumpur, Malaysia
 Swiss Parliament - Bern, Switzerland
 Jungle City Studios - New York City, USA
 Maracana Stadium - Rio de Janeiro, Brazil
 Mineirao Stadium - Belo Horizonte, Brazil
 Diante do Trono recording studio - Belo Horizonte, Brazil
 Circo Beat studio - Buenos Aires, Argentina
 Javeriana University - Bogota, Colombia
 Berklee Valencia - Valencia, Spain
 Oven Studios (Alicia Keys) - New York City, USA
 Roc the Mic Studios (Jay Z) - New York City, USA
 Mad Oak Studios - Boston, USA
 Food Network - New York City, USA
 MTV - Buenos Aires, Argentina
 TV Globo - Rio de Janeiro, Brazil
 Qatar Television - Doha, Qatar
 Zurich Airport - Zurich, Switzerland
 Faena Hotel+Universe - Buenos Aires, Argentina
 NYU - New York City, USA
 Art Institute - United States
 Le Poisson Rouge - New York City, USA
 Murray Arts Center] - Atlanta, USA
 Central Synagogue - New York City, USA
 Iglesia Los Olivos - Buenos Aires, Argentina

Awards and recognition
WSDG is an eleven-time winner of the TEC Award for outstanding achievement in Acoustics/Facility Design, and since the debut of the TEC Awards in 1985, thirty WSDG studio design projects have been nominated (including four multiple-entry nominations).
 2015 Berklee College of Music, 160 Massachusetts Avenue, Boston, United States
 2016 The Church Studios, London, England
 2017 Boston Symphony Orchestra Control Room, Boston, United States

Marriage and children

Storyk is married to his business and life partner Beth Walters. The couple raised two sons in Highland, New York and now live in Highland and the Yucatán Coast in Mexico.

References

External links
 John Storyk Interview - NAMM Oral History Library (2016)
 WSDG-Walters-Storyk Design Group

Living people
American acoustical engineers
20th-century American architects
Princeton University School of Architecture alumni
1946 births
People from Highland, Ulster County, New York
Columbia Graduate School of Architecture, Planning and Preservation alumni
21st-century American architects